The 2007–08 season was the Manitoba Junior Hockey League's (MJHL) 91st season of operation.

Season highlights
The Southeast Blades are sold and relocated from Sagkeeng First Nation to Beausejour, Manitoba.  The team is renamed the Beausejour Blades.
2008 NHL Entry Draft: Sean Collins of Waywayseecappo Wolverines is selected 187 overall by the Columbus Blue Jackets.

Standings

Playoffs

Post MJHL playoffs
Anavet Cup
Portage Terriers defeated by the Humboldt Broncos from the SJHL 4-games-to-0.

League awards
 Steve "Boomer" Hawrysh Award (MVP): Bryan Kauk, Dauphin
 MJHL Top Goaltender Award: Gavin McHale, Portage
 Brian Kozak Award (Top Defenceman): Jason Gray, Winnipeg South
 Vince Leah Trophy (Rookie of the Year): Stephan Vigier, Swan Valley
 Lorne Lyndon Memorial Trophy (Hockey Ability and Sportsmanship): Sean Collins, Waywayyseecappo
 Muzz McPherson Award (Coach of the Year): Blake Spiller, Portage
 Mike Ridley Trophy (Scoring Champion): Bryan Kauk, Dauphin
 MJHL Playoff MVP: Cody Pollon

CJHL awards
 CJAHL Player of the Year (MJHL): Stephan Vigier, Swan Valley

References

External links
 MJHL Website
2007-08 MJHL season at HockeyDB.com

Manitoba Junior Hockey League seasons
MJHL